Emilton Pedroso Domingues, commonly known as Jarro Pedroso  is a Brazilian footballer who plays as a forward for Pelotas-RS. He also holds Uruguayan nationality.

Born in Brazil, he played his youth football in Rio Grande do Sul and Uruguay, breaking into the first team with amateur side Albion in the third tier of Uruguyan football. In 2016 he moved to River Plate in Montevideo, where he made his debut in 2016 Copa Libertadores. He played for Pelotas in Campeonato Gaúcho in 2018 (second division) and 2019 (first division) before being loaned to Atlético Goianiense for the 2019 Campeonato Brasileiro Série B season.

References

External links
 

Living people
1993 births
Brazilian footballers
Association football forwards
Club Atlético River Plate (Montevideo) players
Clube Esportivo Bento Gonçalves players
Esporte Clube Pelotas players
Atlético Clube Goianiense players
Campeonato Brasileiro Série B players
Uruguayan Primera División players